Giuseppe Prisco (10 December 1921 – 12 December 2001), mostly known as Peppino Prisco, was an Italian lawyer and sporting director, known for being the vice-chairman of Inter Milan from 1963 until his death.

Life and career
Prisco was born from Neapolitan parents in Milan on 10 December 1921. At the age of 18, he joined the Italian participation in the Eastern Front as lieutenant of the 9th Alpini Regiment. He was awarded with a Silver Medal of Military Valor for distinguishing himself in combat. He graduated in law in 1944 and became a layer in 1946. In 1948, he married Maria Irene De Vecchi, with which he had two children.

He died from a heart attack on 12 December 2001.

Vice-chairman of Inter Milan
He became an Inter fan in 1921 following an Inter victory in the Milan derby. After that he climbed the hierarchy of the club, becoming an associate member in 1946, secretary in 1949, advisor in 1950, and vice-chairman on 23 July 1963 until his death.

Under his involvement with the club, Inter won 11 Serie A titles together with four Coppa Italia, four Supercoppa Italiana, 2 European Cups, two Intercontinental Cups, and 3 UEFA Cups.

In 2001, he was posthumously awarded the Pirata d'Oro, an award usually given to the best Inter player of the previous season. In 2005, the town of Arcisate dedicated the local football stadium to his memory.

In 2021, he was inducted into Inter Milan Hall of Fame.

References

1921 births
2001 deaths
Italian football chairmen and investors
Inter Milan chairmen and investors